The men's vault event was part of the gymnastics programme at the 1924 Summer Olympics. It was one of nine gymnastics events and it was contested for the third time after 1896 and 1904. The competition was held on Monday, July 21, 1924. Seventy gymnasts from nine nations competed. The eight members of each nation's gymnastics team all competed; Czechoslovakia only had six competitors start the vault. The event was won by Frank Kriz of the United States, the nation's second consecutive victory in the event. Jan Koutný and Bohumil Mořkovský of Czechoslovakia took silver and bronze, respectively, the nation's first medals in the event.

Background

This was the third appearance of the event, which is one of the five apparatus events held every time there were apparatus events at the Summer Olympics (no apparatus events were held in 1900, 1908, 1912, or 1920). After three Games without apparatus events, the vault was one of seven apparatus events in 1924 (five, including the vault, have been held at every Games since, joined by the floor exercise in 1932). A similar event, the sidehorse vault, was held for the only time in Olympic history.

Two nations were competing in the event for the second time: Switzerland had previously competed in 1896 and the United States had competed in 1904. The other seven nations (Czechoslovakia, Finland, France, Great Britain, Italy, Luxembourg, and Yugoslavia) were competing for the first time.

Competition format

The 1924 vault competition was very different from a modern vault competition, or even from other vault competitions at the time. Competitors had to jump from a springboard over a bar to reach the vaulting horse, landing with the hands on the horse and swinging their feet to the ground. Scores were based on the height of the bar (with the maximum score of 10 with the bar set at 1.70 metres above the ground) and the performance of the jump. Each gymnast was allowed three jumps. Scores were reported as 0 to 10; it is unclear whether the three jump scores were averaged or if the highest score was used.

The vault was one of 11 components of the individual all-around score, and thus was also included in the team all-around score.

Schedule

Results

Four gymnasts received a score of 0 when they were unable to clear the bar on any of their three jumps.

References

Official Olympic Report
 

Vault
Men's 1924